Kenora District is a district and census division in Northwestern Ontario, Canada. The district seat is the City of Kenora.

Kenora District also has the lowest population density of any of Ontario's census divisions (it ranks 37th out of 50 by total population).

The district was created in 1907 from parts of Rainy River District. The northern part (north of the Albany River) only became part of Ontario in 1912 (transferred from the Northwest Territories). The separate Patricia District upon transfer, it was in 1937 annexed to Kenora District and known sometimes as the Patricia Portion.

Politics

As with the other districts of Northern Ontario, the Kenora District does not have an organized government like those of counties or regional municipalities in Southern Ontario. All government services in the district are instead provided by the local municipalities, by local services boards in some unincorporated communities, or directly by the provincial government.

Geography

The climate is very harsh because of the influence of the cold waters of Hudson and James Bays: most of the region is taiga characterized by discontinuous permafrost, but on the extreme northern coast there are – remarkably for a latitude of only 54°N – patches of true Arctic tundra and continuous permafrost. This is the southernmost point in the Northern Hemisphere reached by the circumpolar line of continuous permafrost on any continent.

Kenora District is geographically extensive enough to share borders with both the contiguous United States (the boundary between it and the Northwest Angle is located in the Lake of the Woods) and the Canadian Arctic waters (Hudson Bay), the only district in Canada to do so.

The District contains the Sturgeon Lake Caldera, which is one of the world's best preserved Neoarchean caldera complexes and is some 2.7 billion years old.

Subdivisions

Cities

Towns

Townships

First Nations reserves

Unorganized areas
Kenora, Unorganized (including the local services boards of Greater Oxdrift, Melgund, Minaki, Redditt, Round Lake, and Wabigoon)

Demographics

Economy
Most of the population is concentrated in the district's extreme south where some agriculture is possible: the main crop is barley. Traditional native activities such as hunting and fishing dominate the north of the district outside of mining settlements.

Mining 
The area near Lake Minnehaha saw a gold rush between 1902 and 1909. The settlement of Gold Rock served 14 area mines, which included the Big Master, Laurentian, Detola and Elora.  According to Barnes, "Approximately 180,000 ounces of gold was won from 27 mines in the Kenora district from 1880 to 1976," with "over 331 known gold occurrences."  The more successful mines included the Bully Boy, Cameron Island, Champion, Combined, Cornucopia, Gold Hill, Golden Horn, Kenricia, Mikado, Oliver, Olympia, Ophyr, Regina, Scramble, Severn, Stella, Sultana, Treasure and Wendigo.

Mining is currently extremely extensive in northern Kenora District, which contains some of the world's largest and highest-grade reserves of uranium and some of the world's major producers of nickel. A major mining exploration project is currently underway in the Ring of Fire region, centred on the district's isolated McFaulds Lake.

Transportation

Permanent roads (Highway 599) only reach about halfway to the northernmost point of Kenora district, with the provincial highway network ending at Pickle Lake. Some more northerly communities connect seasonally through an ice/winter road network to the Northern Ontario Resource Trail.

Year-round air and summertime river transport are the only means of reaching the most remote parts of the district. 

The major railroad lines between Toronto and British Columbia pass through the south of the district.

Patricia Portion

The Patricia Portion is the part of the Kenora District lying north of the Albany River, which was transferred from the Northwest Territories to Ontario on May 15, 1912, in The Ontario Boundaries Extension Act. This area was originally a separate division, Patricia District, but became part of Kenora District in 1937.

With the exception of a few communities along the northernmost ends of Highway 599 and the Highway 105/Highway 125 corridor, the Patricia Portion consists almost entirely of remote First Nations communities that are only accessible by float plane or winter road. Accordingly, the term "Patricia Portion" is still sometimes used to distinguish the region from the relatively more populated and road-accessible southern portion.

See also 
 List of census divisions of Ontario
 List of townships in Ontario
 List of secondary schools in Ontario#Kenora District

References